is an action-adventure game franchise created by Hideki Kamiya. It is primarily developed and published by Capcom. The series centers on the demon hunter Dante and his efforts to thwart various demon invasions of Earth. Its gameplay consists of combat scenes in which the player must attempt to extend long chains of attacks, avoiding damage and exhibiting stylized combat by varying their attacks; this combat, along with time and the number of items collected and used, are considered in grading the player's performance. Across the series, new characters with unique skills are available.

The series alludes to Dante's Divine Comedy. Hideki Kamiya created Devil May Cry after a failed attempt to develop a Resident Evil game with the first game originally being conceived as Resident Evil 4. Kamiya wanted to create a game with more action features, which Capcom felt the series did not need. The games were directed by Hideaki Itsuno and writer Bingo Morihashi. Capcom announced a new game, DmC: Devil May Cry (developed by Ninja Theory and supervised by Capcom), during the 2010 Tokyo Game Show. A high-definition remastering of the three PlayStation 2 titles was released for PlayStation 3 and Xbox 360 in 2012, and in 2018 for the PlayStation 4, Windows, and Xbox One. The latest game is Devil May Cry 5, released on March 8, 2019.

The series has been successful; the main entries has sold 28 million copies worldwide and received Capcom's Platinum Title award. The success of the video-game series has led to  comic books, novelizations, an animated series, guides, collectibles, publications, and a variety of action figures. Critical response to the gameplay combos has been positive. However, the games' narrative was considered simple until the third installment.

According to Eurogamer, another Capcom franchise, Strider, was a vital influence on the Devil May Cry franchise, and according to Retro Gamer, the over-the-top action of Devil May Cry draws from Strider, particularly in their inclusion of the "boss rush".

Games 

 Devil May Cry: Players assume the role of Dante, a skilled demon hunter. The gameplay focuses on fast-paced, highly-stylized combat; a high style ranking requires long attack and evasion strings while avoiding damage. Although the game also features puzzle-solving and exploration elements retained from its survival-horror origins, they are downplayed in favor of action. In later games, the system was modified; players had to vary their attacks to maintain their style rank. The Devil Trigger enables a player's character to assume a devilish form with additional powers (based on their current weapon), while the character's strength and speed increase, and health is slowly restored. 

 Devil May Cry 2: Dante is generally the game's lead character. Two other playable characters, Lucia and Trish are also available. The ability to perform combination attacks in mid-air and evasion and weapon-change buttons were introduced. With the latter, a player can cycle through ranged weapons without switching to the inventory screen.
 Devil May Cry 3: Dante's Awakening: A selection of gameplay styles were added, allowing the player to focus on favorite techniques or weapons. Each of the four styles gains experience points, which unlock more techniques and abilities without costing red orbs (the series' currency). A second weapon-change button was added, allowing the player to cycle through a character's melee weaponry. The game was re-released as Devil May Cry 3: Special Edition with new skills for Dante and the ability to play as Vergil.
 Devil May Cry: Two different mobile games for feature phones were released in 2007-2008. One has similar gameplay to Devil May Cry 3 and uses enemies and characters from that game. The another one is a 2D side-scrolling beat 'em up.
 Devil May Cry 4: This entry introduces a new protagonist, Nero, who is playable alongside the returning Dante. Nero's Devil Bringer arm gives players the ability to pull distant enemies in to be attacked or destroyed. Nero is also armed with a sword which can be throttled up, allowing players to pre-charge it for extra damage on the next hit; with precise timing, it can be charged after each attack for extra damage and style. As Dante, players can switch fighting styles in mid-combat, allowing more varied and unique combos. The game was re-released as Devil May Cry 4: Special Edition, featuring the ability to play as Vergil as well as returning characters Lady and Trish.
Devil May Cry HD Collection: A collection of the series' first three games for the PlayStation 3 and Xbox 360, ported by Pipeworks Software and Double Helix Games, eventually released on March 22, 2012 in Japan and March 29, 2012 in the US. It was later ported to the PlayStation 4, Windows, and Xbox One on March 13, 2018.
 DmC: Devil May Cry: This reboot of the series introduced a new continuity. Players could reach hidden areas with the Ophion whip and grappling hook. The environment often "attacks" Dante by changing its architecture and infrastructure to a more-hostile form, prompting fast-paced chase sequences and platforming scenarios.
 Devil May Cry 5: This game continues the original continuity from Devil May Cry 4. It again features Nero and Dante as playable characters, as well as a new character named V. Nero's Devil Bringer arm is replaced with a selection of swappable cybernetic arms dubbed Devil Breakers, each one featuring distinct gameplay mechanics. V remotely commands three demons in battle due to his weak physical state.  The game was re-released as Devil May Cry 5: Special Edition, featuring the ability to play as Vergil.
Devil May Cry: Peak of Combat: A mobile-phone game by Yunchang Games, based on Devil May Cry 3. Its rendition of Dante's appearance was criticized, and the developers promised to fix it when the game left the beta period for release in 2020.

Plot

The series begins two millennia before the first game with the demon Sparda, the Black Knight, defeating Demon World ruler Mundus. Sparda stops Mundus from conquering the human world by sealing several Hellgates and Temen-Ni-Gru (the last portal) with a ritual requiring his blood and the aid of a human priestess. Sparda meets Eva, who gives birth to his twin sons Dante and Vergil.

The plot begins with Devil May Cry 3, a year after Dante has a falling-out with Vergil. A large tower erupts from the ground near the shop, and Dante interprets it as a challenge from Vergil. Dante is defeated in Temen-Ni-Gru by Vergil, who takes his locket and leaves with Arkham. Dante's dormant devil power revives him, and he resumes pursuing his brother. Vergil wants to use the pendants their mother gave them in a ritual to create a portal to the Demon World. The battle is joined by Lady, who wants to avenge her mother's death by Arkham; Arkham manipulated the three into completing the ritual, which would allow him to acquire Sparda's sword: the Force Edge. Dante and Vergil defeat him, and resume battling each other. The portal begins to close, and Vergil approaches it. Dante pleads with his brother not to go, but Vergil leaps into the Demon World before the portal closes. Vergil is tested and encounters Mundus, his mother's killer. When Lady returns to the human world, she coins the phrase "devil may cry"; Dante uses it for the shop.

Dante is confronted in Devil May Cry by Trish, who reveals that Mundus is planning to return and only a descendant of Sparda can defeat him. He explores Mallet Island (where Mundus is set to return), encountering demons which include Mundus' general: the undead Vergil, Nelo Angelo. As Dante approaches Mundus, he falls into a trap which reveals that Trish is the demon's agent; he saves her, however, because she resembles his mother. Trish saves Dante from Mundus, and Dante realizes his father's power. Dante defeats Mundus when Trish helps him return Mundus to the Demon World. Dante and Trish escape as the island collapses and work together in the Devil Never Cry shop.

In the Devil May Cry: The Animated Series anime, Trish is a demon hunter; Dante is the bodyguard of Patty, a young heiress who becomes obsessed with him. Patty's mother is descended from a sorcerer who sealed the power of Abigail, an ancient devil lord. Patty is targeted by Sid, a demon seeking Abigail's power. Lady and Trish fight demons summoned by Sid, and Dante kills him.

Dante is invited by Lucia in Devil May Cry 2 to meet her mother, Matier. Dante learns that Arius is collecting artifacts (Arcana) to summon the demon lord Argosax. Dante flips a coin, and decides to help. Lucia confronts Arius, who reveals that he created her. Lucia gives Dante the last of the Arcana before facing Arius alone. Dante encounters Matier, who asks him to take the Arcana to save Lucia from Arius. Lucia attacks Arius, but he captures her. Dante arrives, trades the Arcana for Lucia, and attacks Arius (who escapes). A stream of energy strikes the Ouroboros tower, and a portal to the demon world opens. Dante and Lucia argue about who will enter, and Dante determines that he will go. After Dante leaves, Arius returns to the human world and Lucia defeats him.

In Devil May Cry 4, Dante and Trish discover foul play within the Order of the Sword and investigate while learning its religious leader's scheme to conquer the world using demonic power. Dante seemingly assassinates the Sanctus, only to face a young holy knight named Nero, who awakened his demonic forces as a descendant of Sparda. Nero quests to capture Dante while gaining Yamato, only to learn the Order's dark secrets before being captured by Sanctus through his girlfriend. Dante manages to cripple Sanctus's plans before freeing Nero to finish the job. The two part ways on good terms with Nero allowed keeping Yamato.

In Devil May Cry 5, set several years after Devil May Cry 4, Nero runs a mobile branch of Dante's Devil May Cry business. He befriends Nico, a weapons artist and descendant of the gunsmith who crafted Dante's Ebony and Ivory handguns. Nero's Devil Bringer arm from Devil May Cry 4 is stolen; armed with a prosthetic Devil Breaker created by Nico, he leaves with Dante and the demon hunter V to face their "strongest foe yet".

Although the series' timeline had placed Devil May Cry 4 before Devil May Cry 2, it was retconned with the release of Devil May Cry 5. DmC: Devil May Cry, developed by Ninja Theory, is not part of the timeline and takes place in an alternate universe from the main series. Along with a very different looking Dante, it moves away from the gothic look of the previous games to a more contemporary setting with some social commentary on mass media and culture.

Development

After the completion of Resident Evil 2 in 1998, preliminary work on a PlayStation 2 installment of the Resident Evil series began by Team Little Devil under the direction of Hideki Kamiya. Early research and development included a trip to Spain to examine castles as a basis for the game's environments. Its prototype, however, was a radical departure from the Resident Evil formula and the survival horror genre. Kamiya rewrote the story and changed its premise, drawing from Italian poet Dante Alighieri's Divine Comedy for Devil May Cry.

Despite the success of the original game, its sequel was not created by Kamiya or Team Little Devils. Although an unidentified director was placed in charge of the project, Capcom was dissatisfied with their work and assigned Hideaki Itsuno "with only 4 to 5 months remaining in development" to steer the project back on course. Despite Itsuno's limited time on the project, he is the only person credited as director in the final version of the game. According to producer Tsuyoshi Tanaka, the design aim was to make Devil May Cry 2 bigger than its predecessor; Tanaka estimated that the game's environments were about nine times larger than the first.

After Devil May Cry 2 mixed reception, Capcom decided to develop the next game like the more critically successful Devil May Cry. Gameplay elements, such as environment size and battle engine, were reconsidered. In the original game, Vergil was killed by demons early and his soul was controlled by Mundus; Bingo Morihashi wanted to create an alternate universe in which Vergil was alive. However, Kamiya gave Morihashi the freedom to rework Vergil's backstory and make him a living teenager for Devil May Cry 3. As a result, the game was designed as a prequel to the series, set several years before the events of the first game.

Development of Devil May Cry 4 began shortly after its predecessor's success. The development team had 80 members. A new protagonist was discussed many times at Capcom, but was not approved until producer Hiroyuki Kobayashi said that Dante had to be in the game. Kobashi said before the game's release that they wanted to make Dante seem significantly more powerful than Nero, to create an obvious difference between the strength of a "veteran" compared to a "rookie". Writer Morihashi collaborated with film director Yuji Shimomura, who worked on the earlier games. Morihashi left Capcom at one point, but returned at Itsuno's request. It took him a year to finish writing the game; he had difficulty with the characterization of Nero, the new protagonist. Dante returned as a supporting character.

Although the fourth game was a commercial and critical success, the staff considered rebooting the series because other game series had better sales. They chose Ninja Theory, impressed with their work on Heavenly Sword (which the staff thought would work with a Devil May Cry game). However, in 2013 Itsuno expressed interest in developing a fifth installment. It was originally thought that Itsuno intended for the series to go on hiatus or end if Devil May Cry 4: Special Edition was not a commercial success, but he said in a GameSpot interview that the series' future did not depend on Devil May Cry 4: Special Edition's sales. He alleviated fears that DmC: Devil May Cry's sales would kill the series, confirming that Capcom was satisfied with them. In mid-January 2016, Itsuno tweeted that he had begun work on a new project. Reuben Langdon and Johnny Yong Bosch, who had done voice acting and motion capture for Dante and Nero in Devil May Cry 4, took pictures of themselves in motion-capture gear in March 2016; this led to speculation that a new Devil May Cry game was in development. According to Capcom Vancouver, "It's not a game that [they] announced that [they are] working on at [their] studio". On May 17, 2018, the domain name "DevilMayCry5.com" was registered under Capcom's Onamae domain register.

Devil May Cry 5, featuring the return of Dante and Nero, was confirmed at E3 2018 for release the following year.  Most of the team had worked on the recently released Resident Evil 7, and were experienced with the game engine; Itsuno was influenced by his work in Monster Hunter: World to provide content appealing to new gamers but also felt that making the game challenging would appeal to long-time fans. Other members of the staff had worked on the reboot game DmC: Devil May Cry, but the Osaka team was more willing to make a sequel to the fourth installment of the main series. The team listened to fan opinions about previous games to ensure that the new game appealed to them; an "auto" mode facilitated combos.  Itsuno was moved to tears by a film in which three robots combined into a giant robot to overcome their foe, and wanted to create similar moments. He wanted to convey the style of a Hollywood movie such as Marvel's Avengers series. Kamiya, currently working at PlatinumGames, was interested in making a remake of the first installment and a crossover game with Dante and Bayonetta.

Other media

Light novels
The series has several print adaptations. Two Devil May Cry light novels, written by Shinya Goikeda and illustrated by Shirow Miwa, were published in Japan in 2002 and translated and published in the United States in 2006. The first, Devil May Cry Volume 1, was published in Japan in conjunction with the release of the first game and explored Dante in an adventure set before the game's events. The second, entitled Devil May Cry Volume 2 in the US, was published in Japan to coincide with the second game's release and is set after the first game's events. Tokyopop published the books in the United States in June and November 2006, respectively.

Bingo Morihashi wrote a Devil May Cry 4 novel entitled Devil May Cry 4 Deadly Fortune. The two-volume novel, published in Japan in 2009, has a number of scenes which were not included in the original game due to time constraints. A prequel novel by Morihashi titled Before the Nightmare, set before Devil May Cry 5 and leading to the beginning of the game, was published on March 1, 2019.

Comics and manga
Three issues of a comic adaptation of the first game were published by the Canadian Dreamwave Productions in 2004, but the series was left unfinished when the company went bankrupt the following year. On July 25, 2008, WildStorm (a DC Comics imprint) and Capcom announced that they would collaborate on a Devil May Cry comic-book series. Details about the series were planned to be announced at a later date, but no new information has been provided.

Two volumes of a planned three-part Devil May Cry 3 manga series have been published in Japan and the United States. Set a year before the events of Devil May Cry 3, the manga describes how the characters come to be at the beginning of the game.

On March 7, 2019, Capcom announced that a tie-in manga entitled Devil May Cry 5 Visions of V would be serialized on the Japanese manga-hosting site Line Manga (LINE マンガ). The manga's prologue was published before the serialization began. Illustrated by Tomio Ogata, the manga (only available in Japan) would update every other Sunday beginning on April 27.

Animation
An anime series, Devil May Cry: The Animated Series, premiered on Japan's Wowow TV network on June 12, 2007. The 12-episode series, produced by Madhouse, was directed by Shin Itagaki. Bingo Morihashi, a writer of the third and fourth games, was one of its writers.

In November 2018, Adi Shankar announced that he had acquired the rights to produce a Devil May Cry anime series for Netflix. Shankar, who has been completing a similar animated series for Konami's Castlevania franchise, said that he considered both series part of a shared "Bootleg Multiverse".

In November 2021, Shankar revealed that the show's first season will have 8 episodes. He also have plans for a connected “multi-season arc”, like what he did with Castlevania, and that fan-favorite characters will make their debut throughout the series.

Film
On February 28, 2011, Screen Gems (which made Resident Evil into a film series) had purchased feature-film rights to the Devil May Cry series. Kyle Ward was hired to write the screenplay for the film (based on DmC: Devil May Cry), which would be Dante's origin story. No news has emerged about the project's status.

Plays
Capcom produced Sengoku Basara vs. Devil May Cry a staged amalgam of the Devil May Cry and Sengoku Basara series, in August 2015. In the play, Dante, Lady, Trish, and Vergil encounter mysterious historical ruins while chasing a devil and are sent back in time to Japan's Warring States period; there, they meet Date Masamune, Sanada Yukimura, and other characters from the Sengoku Basara franchise. The play ran at the AiiA 2.5 Theater in Tokyo for 18 performances. Masanari Ujigawa wrote and directed the play, and Hideaki Itsuno and Izaki Matsuno collaborated on the scenery. Kazushi Miyakoda and Tetsuya Yamaura were the producers, supervised by Hiroyuki Kobayashi and Makoto Yamamoto.

Devil May Cry: The Live Hacker, a musical, ran for 13 performances in March 2019 at Zepp DiverCity in Tokyo. Jun Yoriko wrote and directed the musical and its video, and a DVD was released in late August of that year.

Soundtracks

The Devil May Cry series has seen the release of seven separate soundtracks. Initially, Capcom was very reluctant to release an officially sanctioned soundtrack for the Devil May Cry series, due to worries that the products would sell poorly. As a means of testing the market, Capcom decided to ask for pre-release sales.

In other games
Devil May Cry characters appear in the PlayStation versions of the Viewtiful Joe games, another Capcom series created by Hideki Kamiya; Dante is a playable character in the PlayStation 2 port of the first Viewtiful Joe. The PSP version of Viewtiful Joe: Red Hot Rumble also includes Dante and costumes based on Vergil, Trish, Sparda, Marionette, and Plasma.

In a deal between Capcom and Atlus, Megami Tensei character designer Kazuma Kaneko created Dante and Vergil's demonic forms in Devil May Cry 3. In return, Atlus included Dante in his Devil May Cry 2 costume as a character in an enhanced release of Shin Megami Tensei: Nocturne (Maniax in Japan). The English localization of Nocturne was based on the game's Maniax edition.

Dante and Trish are playable characters in Marvel vs. Capcom 3: Fate of Two Worlds, and Vergil, Dante, and Trish are playable characters in its Ultimate Marvel vs. Capcom 3 update. Dante and Vergil retain their Kazuma Kaneko-designed Devil Trigger forms since they are based on the third game of the Devil May Cry series. Dante is also a playable character in Marvel vs. Capcom: Infinite.

The DmC: Devil May Cry version of Dante is a playable character in PlayStation All-Stars Battle Royale, and he is a playable character in Project X Zone for the Nintendo 3DS as half of a pair with Darkstalkers Demitri Maximoff; Lady is a separate character. Dante returns in its sequel, Project X Zone 2, with Vergil; Vergil's future self, Nelo Angelo, is a rival character.

On June 28, 2021, it was announced that a Mii costume based on Dante would appear in the crossover fighting game Super Smash Bros. Ultimate, as a set for the Mii Sword fighter character with clothing inspired by his design from the original Devil May Cry game. The set was released the following day alongside the game's new DLC fighter, Kazuya Mishima from the Tekken series.

Reception

By September 30, 2022, the Devil May Cry series has sold 27 million units worldwide; each installment is a Capcom Platinum Title, selling over a million units. As of October 19, 2022, Devil May Cry 5 is the best-selling game in the series having sold 6.10 million units worldwide.

The series has received generally positive reviews. In 2010, IGN ranked Devil May Cry number 42 and Devil May Cry 3 number 18 on its "Top 100 PlayStation 2 Games" list. The series' gameplay has been praised as innovative. Devil May Cry has been cited as beginning a subgenre of "extreme combat" action games, which focus on powerful heroes fighting hordes of foes with stylized action. It has been described as the first game that "successfully captured the twitch-based, relentlessly free-flowing gameplay style of so many classic 2D action games". The series is the standard against which other 3D hack and slash action games are measured, with comparisons in reviews of games such as God of War, Chaos Legion, and Blood Will Tell. Devil May Cry 5 has three protagonists with distinctive abilities, increasing the number of moves available. According to Hiroyuki Kobayashi, the team's work on Devil May Cry 4 influenced Capcom's Dragon's Dogma.

Response to the series' narrative has been mixed, despite Dante's increased popularity. The series' popularity led to a line of Devil May Cry action figures produced by Toycom, and Kaiyodo produced a Devil May Cry 2 and Devil May Cry 3 Dante action figure.

According to a gamecritics.com reviewer, the story was overly short and the characters underdeveloped. Dante's cockiness was noted as largely absent from Devil May Cry 2.

Devil May Cry 3 and its relationships among the cast in the narrative were found to be superior to Kamiya's original version. Dante's dynamic with Nero in the following game was praised, with critics saying that neither overshadowed the other. Devil May Cry 5s handling of its characters and their connections was well received.

Although well received by most critics, DmC: Devil May Cry was highly controversial with many long time fans due to the dramatic change in Dante's appearance and the move away from the series' iconic gothic style to a modern urban setting.

References

External links

Capcom USA's Devil May Cry portal
Devil May Cry 2 website 
Devil May Cry 3 website 
Devil May Cry 3 Special Edition website 
Devil May Cry 4 website  
Devil May Cry HD Collection website 
DmC: Devil May Cry website 
Devil May Cry 5 website 
Devil May Cry series at MobyGames

Devil May Cry
Action-adventure video games by series
Capcom franchises
Dark fantasy video games
Hack and slash video games by series
Science fantasy video games
Video game franchises
Video game franchises introduced in 2001
Video games about demons
Video games based on mythology
Video games developed in Japan
Video games developed in the United Kingdom
Video games adapted into comics
Video games adapted into novels
Video games adapted into television shows